A ruling pen is a drawing instrument for drawing with ink or with other drawing fluids. Originally used for technical drawings in engineering and cartography together with straight rulers and French curves, it is today used for specific uses, such as picture framing or calligraphy.

Description 

A ruling pen contains ink in a slot between two flexible metal jaws, which are tapered to a point. It enables precise rendering of very thin lines.  The line width can be adjusted by an adjustment screw connecting the jaws. The adjustment screw can optionally have a number dial.

History 
In the Soviet Union, ruling pens were widely used by women for eyebrow hair removal, being used as tweezers.

See also
 List of pen types, brands and companies
 Technical drawing tools

References

Pens
Technical drawing tools